Walter de Fauconberg, 1st Baron Fauconberg (died 1304), Lord of Rise, Withernwick and Skelton, was an English noble.

He was the eldest son of Piers de Faucomberg and Margaret de Montfitchet. He was summoned to parliament in 1295. Through his wife Agnes, he inherited the Barony of Skelton. Walter died in 1304 and was buried at Nunkeeling Priory, Yorkshire.

Marriage and issue
Walter married Agnes, daughter of Peter II de Brus and Hawise de Lancaster, they are known to have had the following known issue:
Peter de Fauconberg, died young.
Walter de Fauconberg, married firstly Isabel de Ros and secondly Alice de Killingholm, had issue.
Frank de Fauconberg
Peter de Fauconberg, a cleric.
Alexander de Fauconberg, a cleric.
John de Fauconberg, married Eve de Bulmer, had issue.
Patrick de Fauconberg
Avice de Fauconberg
Lorette de Fauconberg
Hawise de Fauconberg
Agnes de Fauconberg, married Nicolas d'Engaine, had issue.

References
Burke, Bernard. A Genealogical History of the Dormant: Abeyant, Forfeited, and Extinct Peerages of the British Empire. Harrison, 1866.

13th-century births
Year of birth uncertain
1304 deaths
13th-century English nobility
14th-century English nobility
1